Sana Sayyad (born 29 October 1994) is an Indian actress who works in Hindi television. She is known for participating in Splitsvilla 8, her portrayal of Drishti Sharma in Divya Drishti, and Sejal Kotadia Nanda in Spy Bahu.

Early life 
Sayyad was born on 29 October 1994 and belongs to a Muslim family. Sayyad's father Yaquib Sayyad, works in the Merchant Navy.

Personal life 
Sayyad revealed in February 2021, that she is dating entrepreneur Imaad Shamsi. Sayyad married Shamsi on 25 June 2021 in an intimate Nikaah ceremony.

Career 
Sayyad started her career in 2015 by participating in MTV Splitsvilla 8, where she finished as the runner-up with Utkarsh Gupta.

In 2015, she made her acting debut with Boyz Will Be Boyz, portraying Ashita opposite Ashwini Koul. She then portrayed Avanti in Yeh Hai Aashiqui Sun Yaar Try Maar opposite Shehzad Shaikh, the same year.

In 2016, Sayyad portrayed Aditi Vashisht in Jaana Na Dil Se Door, and Megha in MTV Girls on Top.

In 2017, she was seen as Manisha in an episode of Crime Patrol. In 2018, she portrayed Amrit Kakkar Chopra in Papa By Chance opposite Zebby Singh.

From 2019 to 2020, Sayyad portrayed Drishti Sharma Shergill in Divya Drishti, opposite Adhvik Mahajan. It proved as a major turning point in her career.

From 2020 to 2021, she portrayed Sonam Goel Jaiswal in Lockdown Ki Love Story opposite Mohit Malik.

In 2022, Sayyad received further praises for her portrayal of Sejal Kotadia Nanda / Mahira Mirza, a RAW agent, in Spy Bahu opposite Sehban Azim.

Since March 2023, she is portraying Dr. Palki Khurana alongside Paras Kalnawat and Baseer Ali post generation leap in Zee TV's Kundali Bhagya.

Filmography

Television

Awards and nominations

See also 
 List of Indian television actresses
 List of Hindi television actresses

References

External links 
 
 

Living people
Indian television actresses
Place of birth missing (living people)
1994 births